Filadelfia is a city in Paraguay. 

Filadelfia may also refer to:

Europe 

 Filadelfia, Calabria, Italy

Nea Filadelfeia, a suburb in the northern part of Athens, Greece
Stadio Filadelfia, an historic football stadium in Turin, Italy

South America 
Filadélfia, Amazonas, an indigenous village in Brazil
Filadélfia, Bahia, a municipality in Bahia, Brazil
Filadelfia, Caldas, Colombia
Filadélfia, Tocantins, a municipality in Tocantins, Brazil
Filadelfia de Guanacaste, Costa Rica

See also 
 The Polish, Slovak (archaic), Portuguese (with acute accent), Spanish, and Italian names for Philadelphia in the United States
Philadelphia (disambiguation)